Senior Colonel Karl Gustaf Börje Wallberg (28 February 1923 in Södertälje – 19 December 2014) was a Swedish military officer and philatelist who was added to the Roll of Distinguished Philatelists in 1994.

Wallberg formed Gold medal award-winning collections of Mongolia, classic Korea, North Korea, Cambodia and Laos. He won the Strandell Medal of the Philatelic Society of Sweden and the Personal Medal of King Carl-XVI-Gustaf.

Wallberg pursued a military career in the Swedish Army from 1946 to 1983, a.o. serving as commander of the Norrland Logistic Regiment from 1972 to 1974 and as Inspector of the Swedish Army Service Troops from 1974 to 1983. He was elected a member of the Royal Swedish Academy of War Sciences in 1976.

References

1923 births
2014 deaths
Signatories to the Roll of Distinguished Philatelists
Swedish philatelists
Fellows of the Royal Philatelic Society London
Swedish Army colonels
Members of the Royal Swedish Academy of War Sciences
People from Södertälje